Jody Lawrance  (born  Nona Josephine Goddard; October 19, 1930 – July 10, 1986) was an American actress who starred in many Hollywood films during the 1950s through the early 1960s.

Biography
She was born October 19, 1930 as Nona Josephine Goddard, or Josephine Lawrence Goddard (sources disagree) in Fort Worth, Texas to Ervin Silliman "Doc" and Eleanor Roeck Goddard.  In 1935, Jody's father, Doc, married Grace Mckee (née Clara Grace Atchinson).  Grace and her foster daughter, Norma Jean Baker (Marilyn Monroe) moved in with the family in Van Nuys, California and the two became stepsisters.

As a teenager, Lawrance attended Beverly Hills High School and Hollywood Professional School, training as an actress with Bento Schneider. In 1946, Lawrance performed as a swimmer in the Larry Crosby Water Show.

In 1949, she adopted the screen name Jody (short for Josephine) Lawrance (her maternal grandmother's maiden name) for her first role as Mary on The Silver Theater television show.

Her first big break came in 1949 when she was signed to a 7-year contract with Columbia Pictures, earning $250 per week. In 1951, Lawrance made her screen debut in Mask of the Avenger starring John Derek. The Family Secret was her second film, again starring Derek along with Lee J. Cobb, followed by Ten Tall Men starring Burt Lancaster, which premiered in October 1951. As the leading lady in three major movies, Jody was on her way to becoming a star.

In 1952, she won the lead role in The Son of Dr. Jekyll with Louis Hayward and The Brigand starring Anthony Dexter. In 1953, Columbia asked Lawrance to make a musical, All Ashore with Mickey Rooney. Unsure of her singing ability, Lawrance asked to be replaced by another actor who would be better suited for the role. Columbia refused, and Lawrance reluctantly made the movie, but the studio branded Jody as a troublemaker, and in 1953 she was released from her contract.
Wanting to continue working, Lawrance took the role of Pocahontas in the controversial independent film Captain John Smith and Pocahontas which was universally panned and was a box office failure due to film's low budget and depiction of onscreen gun violence. Lawrance, on a budget, dyed her own hair black and suffered a horrible allergic reaction, but persevered and delivered one of her most memorable performances. Lawrance changed her last name to Lawrence for this film. It is unknown if it was because of contractual obligations, or simply a spelling mistake.
In 1954, in order to make ends meet, Lawrance took a job as a waitress at Robb's Restaurant in the Westwood district of Los Angeles and Blum's Ice Cream and Candy Shop in Beverly Hills. During this time, she was interviewed by Bob Thomas in a nationally syndicated article which appeared in January of the following year. In the article Lawrence explained that she was now only making a salary of five dollars a day with roughly an equal amount in tips. When asked why her career took a nosedive, she explained to Thomas, "I see now that I was temperamental. I didn't cooperate with publicity. I didn't want to do cheesecake, not because my legs are bad, because they aren't. My entire training has been as an actress, I didn't want to submit to the usual starlet routine."

In the Thomas article, Lawrence went on to say, "If I had to do it over again, I would do it differently. I realize now that cheesecake and publicity are an important part of the movie business."

During one of her shifts, she reportedly attempted to hide from Lancaster, her former co-star in Ten Tall Men, as he entered the restaurant. He spotted her anyway. "If you knew the jobs I've had," he said, "you wouldn't hide your face."

Burt later exclaimed, "What is Jody Lawrance, a movie star, doing working as a waitress?" Lawrance explained her situation and Burt vowed to help get her back into show business. A few weeks later, true to his word, Burt introduced Lawrence to his friend, the director of Casablanca Michael Curtiz. He subsequently spotted her at the restaurant himself, remembered her, offered her a screen test and cast Lawrance in the film The Scarlet Hour with Carol Ohmart and Tom Tryon.

Now a blonde, Lawrance's career was reignited and Paramount Pictures signed her to a contract, earning $300 a week. In October, Lawrance was named as one of the Deb Stars of '55 along with Anita Ekberg and Kathryn Grant, and 1956 brought the release of The Leather Saint, reuniting her with John Derek and starring Cesar Romero.

In 1957, just as her career was getting back on track, Paramount suddenly released Lawrance from her contract. Studio executives found out that she secretly married Bruce Michael Tilton, an airplane parts company executive, in Las Vegas, Nevada, and was pregnant with their first child. Her daughter, Victoria, was born in Los Angeles on October 6, 1957.

Lawrance’s career and home life were at a crossroads; she still held on to the belief that she could once again resurrect her career, but Bruce wanted a wife and mother to stay home and raise their family. Unsure about what path to choose, in April, 1958, Lawrance travelled to Las Vegas twice to file, then changed her mind and dismissed each divorce complaint.

Both citing emotional cruelty, Bruce Tilton was granted a divorce from Lawrance on March 26, 1958, and asked for custody of their daughter, Victoria, now 2 years old.

Lawrance continued to find work even though her personal life was in turmoil. She landed a minor role opposite Shirley MacLaine in The Hot Spell, and a leading role in an episode of the Perry Mason television series, "Case of the Perjured Parrot."

In 1959, Lawrance found another minor role in the mobster movie The Purple Gang starring Barry Sullivan and Robert Blake.

On June 3, 1960 Lawrance temporarily lost custody of Victoria.

Lawrance continued to try to find work, but the roles became more infrequent. This included work in television programs like The Loretta Young Show, The Red Skelton Hour and The Rebel. In the first season of the latter series, she appeared in two episodes including the season finale, "The Earl of Durango," where she played a pivotal role. Her last film, Stagecoach to Dancers' Rock starring Martin Landau, was released in 1962.

It was during this time that Lawrance met and fell in love with Robert Wolf Herre. Unlike her previous relationships, he was not blinded by the limelights of Hollywood. Instead he was an avid outdoorsman who appealed to Lawrance’s adventurous side. Playing golf, camping, and going on fishing trips, were a regular part of life together for almost 25 years.

Lawrance and Herre married on November 1, 1962, in Las Vegas.

On May 16, 1961 Lawrance gave birth to her son, Robert Wolf Herre, Jr. Their daughter Abigail Christian "Chrissy" Herre was born on October 10, 1963.

Outside of the limelight, Lawrance focused her energies on her family and outdoor activities. An avid golfer, Mrs. Herre participated in the Ojai Valley Country Club women's championship tournament in 1964.

As Josephine Lawrance Herre, she died at age 55 in Ojai on July 10, 1986. Her interment was in California.

Filmography

Notes

External links 

 
 
 

1930 births
1986 deaths
American film actresses
20th-century American actresses
People from Fort Worth, Texas
Actresses from Texas